Trackin' is an album by saxophonist Eddie "Lockjaw" Davis recorded in 1962 for the Prestige label.

Reception
Critic Don Nelsen wrote in his Down Beat review in the December 19, 1963 issue: "This is a blue-chip performance from Davis & Co.  As usual the tenorist swings with big sound and unabashed attack, but rarely has he been so inventive with his horn as he is here."

The Allmusic review states simply "A five piece with Don Patterson on the Hammond B-3 and Paul Weeden on guitar".

Track listing 
 "There Will Never Be Another You" (Mack Gordon, Harry Warren) - 4:46  
 "What's New?" (Johnny Burke, Bob Haggart) - 4:00 
 "Too Marvelous for Words" (Johnny Mercer, Richard A. Whiting) - 4:35   
 "A Foggy Day" (George Gershwin, Ira Gershwin) - 5:07 
 "Beano" (John Campbell) - 5:18 
 "Day by Day" (Sammy Cahn, Axel Stordahl, Paul Weston) - 6:45   
 "Robbins Nest" (Illinois Jacquet, Bob Russell, Sir Charles Thompson) - 5:38

Personnel 
 Eddie "Lockjaw" Davis - tenor saxophone
 Don Patterson - organ
 Paul Weeden - guitar
 George Duvivier - bass
 Billy James - drums

References 

Eddie "Lockjaw" Davis albums
1962 albums
Albums produced by Ozzie Cadena
Albums recorded at Van Gelder Studio
Prestige Records albums